"My Love of This Land" is Killing Joke's second single from their seventh studio album, Outside the Gate. It was released by E.G. Records on 3 July 1988.

"My Love of this Land" reached No. 89 on the UK Singles Chart.

Releases 
"My Love of This Land" was first released as a 7" single, backed by B-side "Darkness Before Dawn" (previously from the album Night Time). "My Love of This Land" was then released as a 10" single in the UK, featuring a remix of the song by Glenn Skinner on the A-side, along with "Darkness Before Dawn", and "Follow the Leaders-Dub" and "Sun Goes Down" on the B-side. A third release of the single as a 12" featured the same A-side as the 10" release, while the B-side included a live version of "Pssyche" with "Follow the Leaders-Dub".

Track listings

7" single 
Side A
"My Love of This Land" – 04:14

Side B
"Darkness Before Dawn" – 05:18

10" single 
Side A
"My Love of This Land" – 03:58
"Darkness Before Dawn" – 05:18

Side B
"Follow the Leaders-Dub" – 04:00
"Sun Goes Down" – 04:19

12" single 
Side A
"My Love of This Land" – 03:58
"Darkness Before Dawn" – 05:18

Side B
"Follow the Leaders-Dub" – 04:00
"Pssyche (Live)" – 04:38

Track listings notes

Charts

References

External links 

1988 songs
1988 singles
Killing Joke songs
Songs written by Geordie Walker
Songs written by Jaz Coleman
E.G. Records singles